Xinjiang Tianshan Leopard F.C. is a defunct professional Chinese football club that participated in the China League One division under licence from the Chinese Football Association (CFA). The team was based in Ürümqi, Xinjiang. Their majority shareholder is the Urumqi Juntai Real Estate Co., Ltd. (Juntai Group)

The club dissolved in February 2023.

History
Hubei China-Kyle was established in December 2011 by the China-Kyle Special Steel Co., Ltd and they brought in Li Jianzhong as their chairman as well as Li Jun as their first manager. With the aid from the Hubei Football Association they formed a team and registered to play within the third tier of the Chinese football league system in the 2012 league season. Their home location was the Huangshi Stadium and all blue was chosen as their home uniform. In their debut season they finished fourth place in the South Group and advanced into the play-offs where after beating Hebei Zhongji and Shenzhen Fengpeng they ultimately came runners-up to Guizhou Zhicheng within the division, nonetheless that position ensured promotion to the China League One division.

In their first appearance within the second division the club would struggle with the higher level of finance and professionalism required within the division. Before the start of the season the team could not afford the plane tickets required to go their training camp set in Dongguan, Guangdong and had to go there by coach. Despite the financial constraints Li Jun was able to avoid relegation on the final day of the season when the team beat Chengdu Tiancheng 2–0 at home. At the start of the 2014 league season the club would publicly declare they were looking for investment and were willing to leave Hubei Province to obtain it. This saw speculation grow that the club were going to move to Xi'an, but talks between the city broke down. The Xinjiang Uygur Autonomous Region Sports Bureau, however would express interest in investing into the club, which initially saw them take over their Under-20 team. On 14 February 2014 the Xinjiang Uygur Autonomous Region Sports Bureau followed through with their investment by providing the Xinjiang Sports Centre, training facilities and sponsorship, which saw Hubei China-Kyle moved to Xinjiang's capital city Ürümqi and changed their name to Xinjiang Tianshan Leopard. The club would gain sponsorship from local real estate company Urumqi Juntai Real Estate Co., Ltd. (Juntai Group) who decided to become the club's main investor throughout the season.

In the 2018 China League One, Xinjiang suffered a shock as they finished last in the division, but due to the dissolution of Dalian Transcendence and Yanbian Funde, and Zhejiang Yiteng being unable to apply for a League One license, Xinjiang miraculously managed to stay afloat in the League One.

The club dissolved in February 2023.

Name history
2011–2013 Hubei China-Kyle F.C. 湖北华凯尔
2014–2022 Xinjiang Tianshan Leopard 新疆天山雪豹

Managerial history
  Li Jun (2012–2018)
  Paul Put (2018)
  Fernando (2019–2020)
  Polat Kutulk (caretaker) (2020)
  Pei Encai (2021–2022)

Results
All-time league rankings

As of the end of 2019 season.

 In group stage.

Key
 Pld = Played
 W = Games won
 D = Games drawn
 L = Games lost
 F = Goals for
 A = Goals against
 Pts = Points
 Pos = Final position

 DNQ = Did not qualify
 DNE = Did not enter
 NH = Not Held
 – = Does Not Exist
 R1 = Round 1
 R2 = Round 2
 R3 = Round 3
 R4 = Round 4

 F = Final
 SF = Semi-finals
 QF = Quarter-finals
 R16 = Round of 16
 Group = Group stage
 GS2 = Second Group stage
 QR1 = First Qualifying Round
 QR2 = Second Qualifying Round
 QR3 = Third Qualifying Round

References 

 
Defunct football clubs in China
2014 establishments in China
2023 disestablishments in China
Association football clubs established in 2014
Association football clubs disestablished in 2023
Huangshi
Sport in Hubei
Sport in Xinjiang